George Dod Armstrong (September 15, 1813 – May 11, 1899) was a Presbyterian minister and author born in Mendham, New Jersey. He was one of ten children by Amzi Armstrong, a Presbyterian pastor, and Polly Dod.

George Armstrong graduated from Princeton University in 1832 and then taught school until he entered Union Theological Seminary, Virginia. He became a professor of chemistry and mechanics in 1838 at Washington College in Lexington, Virginia now Washington and Lee University.  He taught there with Henry Ruffner and George Dabney.  He held this position for thirteen years when he left to become pastor of the First Presbyterian Church in Norfolk, Virginia. He remained here until his death in 1899.

George Armstrong served as a chaplain in the Confederate States Army.

In 1855 his family was nearly destroyed by Yellow Fever losing 3 children and his wife.  In 1856 he authored a personal account of the epidemic: The Summer of the Pestilence.

Support of slavery 
Armstrong was one of many American ministers and prominent Christians who vocally supported the institution of slavery and rejected abolitionism in the years prior to the Civil War. In his publication The Christian Doctrine of Slavery, Armstrong lays out his defense of the institution of slavery based on his reading of the Bible.

Works 
Politics and the Pulpit  1856
The Christian Doctrine of Slavery  1857 Full Text available at Internet Archive
Doctrine of Baptism 1857
The Theology of Christian Experience  1858
"The Good Hand of Our God Upon Us," a Thanksgiving Sermon Preached on the Occasion of the Victory of Manassas  1861
The Sacraments of the New Testament as Instituted by Christ  1880
The Two Books of Nature and Revelation Collated  1886

References

 Starr, Harris Elwood. "Armstrong, George Dod." Dictionary of American Biography. Vol. 1, Charles Scribner's Sons. 1928.
 Worldcat.org

External links 
The Summer of the Pestilence.
Tombstone Inscriptions

1813 births
1899 deaths
Princeton University alumni
Union Presbyterian Seminary alumni
19th-century American writers
Presbyterian Church in the United States of America ministers
19th-century American clergy